Thalangama North A Grama Niladhari Division is a Grama Niladhari Division of the Kaduwela Divisional Secretariat of Colombo District of Western Province, Sri Lanka. It has Grama Niladhari Division Code 477.

Thalangama North A is a surrounded by the Udumulla South, Batapotha, Battaramulla North, Muttettugoda, Himbutana East, Udumulla, Walpola and Himbutana West Grama Niladhari Divisions.

Demographics

Ethnicity 
The Thalangama North A Grama Niladhari Division has a Sinhalese majority (96.4%). In comparison, the Kaduwela Divisional Secretariat (which contains the Thalangama North A Grama Niladhari Division) has a Sinhalese majority (95.6%)

Religion 
The Thalangama North A Grama Niladhari Division has a Buddhist majority (90.4%). In comparison, the Kaduwela Divisional Secretariat (which contains the Thalangama North A Grama Niladhari Division) has a Buddhist majority (90.4%)

References 

Grama Niladhari Divisions of Kaduwela Divisional Secretariat